The 1978 Stinkers Bad Movie Awards were released by the Hastings Bad Cinema Society in 1979 to honour the worst the film industry had to offer in 1978. The ballot was later revisited and the expanded version was released in the summer of 2003. Listed as follows are the original ballot's picks for Worst Picture and its dishonourable mentions, which are films that were considered for Worst Picture but ultimately failed to make the final ballot (15 total), and all nominees included in the expanded ballot. All winners are highlighted.

Original Ballot

Worst Picture

Dishonourable Mentions 

 Attack of the Killer Tomatoes! (NAI)
 Avalanche (New World)
 The Boys from Brazil (Fox)
 Days of Heaven (Paramount)
 Eraserhead (AFI)
 F. I. S. T. (United Artists)
 Game of Death (Columbia)
 Goin' Coconuts (Osmond Entertainment)
 It Lives Again (Warner Bros.)
 Oliver's Story (Paramount)
 Rabbit Test (AVCO Embassy)
 Renaldo and Clara (Circuit Films)
 Sextette (CIP)
 The Swarm (Warner Bros.)
 Thank God It's Friday (Columbia)

Expanded Ballot

Worst Picture

Dishonourable Mentions 

 Avalanche (New World)
 The Bad News Bears Go to Japan (Paramount)
 Damien: Omen II (Fox)
 F.I.S.T. (United Artists)
 Goin' Coconuts (Osmond Entertainment)
 The Hound of the Baskervilles (Atlantic)
 It Lives Again (Warner Bros.)
 Laserblast (Irwin Yablans Company)
 The Lord of the Rings (United Artists)
 The Norseman (AIP)
 Rabbit Test (AVCO Embassy)
 Sextette (CIP)
 The Swarm (Warner Bros.)

Worst Director

Dishonourable Mentions 

 Irwin Allen for The Swarm
 Ralph Bakshi for The Lord of the Rings
 John Berry for The Bad News Bears Go to Japan
 Paul Morrissey for The Hound of the Baskervilles
 Charles B. Pierce for The Norseman
 Michael Rae for Laserblast
 Michael Schultz for Sgt. Pepper's Lonely Heart's Club Band
 Don Taylor for Damien: Omen II

Worst Actor

Dishonourable Mentions 

 Billy Crystal in Rabbit Test
 Tony Curtis in The Bad News Bears Go to Japan and The Manitou
 Peter Frampton in Sgt. Pepper's Lonely Heart's Club Band
 Richard Gere in Bloodbrothers
 Tony LoBianco in Bloodbrothers
 Paul Sorvino in Bloodbrothers

Worst Actress

Dishonourable Mentions 

 Joan Collins in The Stud
 Shelley Hack in If Ever I See You Again
 Ali MacGraw in Convoy
 Tatum O'Neal in International Velvet
 Diana Ross in The Wiz

Worst Supporting Actor

Dishonourable Mentions 

 Billy Barty in Foul Play
 Jeremy Black in The Boys From Brazil
 Peter Cook in The Hound of the Baskervilles
 Eddie Deezen in Laserblast
 Sterling Hayden in King of the Gypsies
 Dudley Moore in Foul Play
 Alex Rocco in Rabbit Test
 Jonathan Scott-Taylor in Damien: Omen II

Worst Supporting Actress

Dishonourable Mentions 

 Ann-Margret in The Cheap Detective
 Dyan Cannon in Heaven Can Wait
 Sandy Farina in Sgt. Pepper's Lonely Heart's Club Band
 Doris Roberts in Rabbit Test

Worst Screenplay

Dishonourable Mentions 

 The Bad News Bears Go to Japan (Paramount)
 Damien: Omen II (Fox)
 F.I.S.T. (United Artists)
 Sextette (CIP)
 Sgt. Pepper's Lonely Heart's Club Band (Universal)
 The Swarm (Warner Bros.)

Most Painfully Unfunny Comedy

Dishonourable Mentions 

 The Cat from Outer Space (Disney)
 California Suite (Columbia)
 The Cheap Detective (Columbia)
 Every Which Way But Loose (Warner Bros.)
 Goin' Coconuts (Osmond Entertainment)
 Revenge of the Pink Panther (United Artists)
 Who Is Killing the Great Chefs of Europe? (Warner Bros.)

Worst Song or Song Performance in a Film or Its End Credits

Dishonourable Mentions 

 "California" by Joe Brooks from If Ever I See You Again
 "Can You Read My Mind?" by Margot Kidder from Superman The Movie
 "Convoy" by C.W. McCall from Convoy
 "Here's Another Fine Mess" by Paul Williams from The End
 "Fixing A Hole" by George Burns from Sgt. Pepper's Lonely Heart's Club Band
 "FM" by Steely Dan from FM
 "For You and I" by 10cc from Moment by Moment
 "Love Will Keep Us Together" by Timothy Dalton & Mae West from Sextette
 "Maxwell's Silver Hammer" by Steve Martin from Sgt. Pepper's Lonely Heart's Club Band
 "Up In Smoke" by Cheech and Chong from Up in Smoke
 "You Can't Win" by Michael Jackson from The Wiz

Worst On-Screen Couple

Dishonourable Mentions 

 Cheech and Chong in Up in Smoke
 Peter Cook and Dudley Moore in The Hound of the Baskervilles
 Farrah Fawcett-Majors and Jeff Bridges in Somebody Killed Her Husband
 Charles Grodin and Dyan Cannon in Heaven Can Wait
 Kris Kristofferson and Ali MacGraw in Convoy
 Lee Majors and his fake moustache in The Norseman
 Donny and Marie Osmond in Goin' Coconuts
 Robert Redford and/or James Caan and Jane Fonda in The Electric Horseman and/or Comes a Horseman

Worst Fake Accent (Male)

Dishonourable Mentions 

 Peter Falk in The Cheap Detective
 Tony Lo Bianco in Bloodbrothers
 Alex Rocco in Rabbit Test
 Paul Sorvino in Bloodbrothers

Worst Fake Accent (Female)

Dishonourable Mention 

 Marilu Henner in Bloodbrothers

Most Annoying Non-Human Character

Worst Sequel

Dishonourable Mentions 

 International Velvet (MGM)
 Oliver's Story (Paramount)

Worst On-Screen Group

Dishonourable Mentions 

 The aliens who seem to be appearing in a different movie in Laserblast
 The Bee Gees in Sgt. Pepper's Lonely Heart's Club Band
 The Supermodels in The Eyes of Laura Mars

References 

Stinkers Bad Movie Awards